Lattice pastry is a pastry used in a criss-crossing pattern of strips in the preparation of various foods. Latticed pastry is used as a type of lid on many various tarts and pies. The openings between the lattice allows fruit juices in pie fillings to evaporate during the cooking process, which can  caramelize the filling.

See also
 Croline
 Latticework

References

Pastries